Aziz Kand (also Romanized as ‘Azīz Kand; also known as ‘Azīz Kandī) is a village in Akhtachi Rural District, in the Central District of Bukan County, West Azerbaijan Province, Iran. At the 2006 census, its population was 244, in 49 families.

References 

Populated places in Bukan County